Margaret Ann Courtney (16 April 1834 – 12 May 1920) was an English poet and folklorist based in Penzance, Cornwall.

Family life
Margaret Ann Courtney was born at Penzance in 1834, the eldest daughter of Sarah Mortimer Courtney and John Sampson Courtney. Her mother was from Scilly; her father from Devon. One brother, John Mortimer Courtney, was a government official in Canada; another, Leonard Henry Courtney, was a British politician. Her younger sister Louise d'Este Courtney married Richard Oliver, a New Zealand politician from Cornwall.

Publications
M. A. Courtney is perhaps best known for her book Cornish Feasts and Folk-Lore (1890), a detailed description of many of the traditions and folklore present in west Cornwall. It has also appeared under the title Folklore and Legends of Cornwall. Other titles by Courtney included Cornish Feasts and Feasten Times (1910) and Glossary of Words in Use in Cornwall (1880, co-authored with Dr. Thomas Quiller Couch).

A poem by Margaret Ann Courtney was included in the 2000 collection Voices from West Barbary: an anthology of Anglo-Cornish poetry 1549-1928.

See also  

West Cornwall May Day celebrations
Allantide
Golowan
Guise dancing

References

1834 births
1920 deaths
Writers about Cornwall
History of Cornwall
People from Penzance
Cornish folklore